Raihanuddin Chowdhury (born 25 March 1985) is a Bangladeshi cricketer. He made his first-class debut for Chittagong Division in the 2003–04 National Cricket League on 3 January 2004.

References

1985 births
Living people
Bangladeshi cricketers
Chittagong Division cricketers
People from Chittagong